Virginia Union University is a private historically black Baptist university in Richmond, Virginia. It is affiliated with the American Baptist Churches USA.

History

The American Baptist Home Mission Society (ABHMS) founded the school as Richmond Theological Institute in 1865 shortly after Union troops took control of Richmond, Virginia, at the end of the American Civil War, for African-American freedmen to enter into the ministry. The college had the first academic library at an HBCU, building the library in 1865 the same year the college was established.

Its mission was soon expanded to offer courses and programs at college, high school, and preparatory levels, to both men and women. This effort was the beginning of Virginia Union University. Separate branches of the National Theological Institute were set up in Washington, D.C., and Richmond, Virginia, with classes beginning in 1867. In Washington, the school became known as Wayland Seminary, named in commemoration of Dr. Francis Wayland, former president of Brown University and a leader in the anti-slavery struggle. The first and only president was Dr. George Mellen Prentiss King, who administered Wayland for thirty years (1867–1897). Famous students there included Dr. Booker T. Washington and Dr. Adam Clayton Powell, Sr.

Beginning in 1867, Colver Institute was housed in a building long known as Lumpkin's Jail, a former "slave jail" owned by Mary Ann Lumpkin, the African-American widow of the deceased white owner. It became  Richmond Theological Institute (formerly Colver and joined with Wayland Seminary of Washington in 1899 to form Virginia Union University at Richmond.

In 1932, the women's college Hartshorn Memorial College, established in Richmond in 1883, became a part of Virginia Union University. Storer College, a historically black Baptist college in West Virginia founded in 1867, merged its endowment with Virginia Union in 1964.

Academics
The university is divided into four main schools:

Evelyn Reid Syphax School of Education and Interdisciplinary Studies
School of Arts and Sciences
Samuel DeWitt Proctor School of Theology
Sydney Lewis School of Business

Theology program
Virginia Union University's Theological training program is called "The Samuel DeWitt Proctor School of Theology at Virginia Union University". The school of theology has produced preachers such as Dean John W. Kinney, Dr. Miles Jones, Dr. A.B. James, and Dr. James Henry Harris. The school is a member of the Washington Theological Consortium.

Student activities

Fraternities and sororities
All of the National Pan-Hellenic Council organizations are currently at Virginia Union University. These organizations are:

Athletics

Virginia Union competes in the NCAA Division II in the Eastern Division of the Central Intercollegiate Athletic Association.  The school has varsity teams in men's basketball, football, cross country, golf, tennis and track and field, and in women's basketball, bowling, cross country, tennis and track and field, softball and volleyball.

In 2018, both Virginia Union University's DII Men & Women's Basketball Teams won the CIAA Championship.
Virginia Union plays basketball and volleyball in the Barco-Stevens Hall, built as the Belgian Building for the 1939 New York World's Fair. The building, which has stone reliefs depicting the Belgian Congo, was one of thirteen facilities designated as "unique" by NCAA News in 2005. The building was awarded to the university in 1941 and moved to its present location in 1943. The basketball team began using the facility in early 1947.

Affiliations 
It is affiliated with the American Baptist Churches USA.

Notable alumni

References

External links

Virginia Union University
Virginia Union University athletics

 
University and college buildings on the National Register of Historic Places in Virginia
Historically black universities and colleges in the United States
Former women's universities and colleges in the United States
Private universities and colleges in Virginia
Universities and colleges affiliated with the American Baptist Churches USA
Seminaries and theological colleges in Virginia
National Register of Historic Places in Richmond, Virginia
Baptist Christianity in Virginia
Educational institutions established in 1865
Education in Richmond, Virginia
Universities and colleges accredited by the Southern Association of Colleges and Schools
African-American history in Richmond, Virginia
1865 establishments in Virginia